Community Service II is the second collaboration album from The Crystal Method, and features remixes from The Crystal Method and other Nu skool breaks artists.

Track listing 

 The Crystal Method - Intro – 1:38
 PMT - Gyromancer (Elite Force Mix) – 4:14
 Elite Force - Ghetto Fabulous – 5:30
 Hyper - Come With Me – 5:02
 The Doors - Roadhouse Blues (The Crystal Method vs. The Doors) – 4:57
 Evil Nine - We Have The Energy – 5:00
 Dylan Rhymes feat. Katherine Ellis - Salty (Meat Katie Mix) – 5:36
 The Crystal Method - Keep Hope Alive (J.D.S Mix) – 5:44
 Koma + Bones - Speedfreak – 2:39
 The Crystal Method feat. Kevin Beber - Kalifornia – 4:25
 Überzone - Octopus – 2:42
 UNKLE feat. Ian Brown - Reign (False Prophet Mix) – 6:38
 The Crystal Method - Starting Over (Elite Force Mix) – 4:40
 The Crystal Method - Bound Too Long (Hyper Mix) – 5:24
 New Order - Bizarre Love Triangle (The Crystal Method's CSII Mix) – 5:32
 Smashing Pumpkins - 1979 (New Originals 1799 Remix) – 6:57

CSII Exclusives EP
At approximately the same time as the release of the album, the CSII Exclusives EP was released in a digital-only format, exclusively on the iTunes Store.  The EP contained an additional track, "Bad Ass", as well as the full-length, unmixed versions of tracks 8, 10, 13, and 14.

Track listing 
 "Badass" – 5:23
 "Bound Too Long (Hyper Mix)" – 7:07
 "Kalifornia" – 5:39
 "Keep Hope Alive (JDS Mix)" – 7:46
 "Starting Over (Elite Force Mix)" – 8:05

Personnel 

Chris Allen – Mixing
Tom Beaufoy – Producer
Marvin Beaver – Producer, Remixing
Kevin Beber – Producer, Mixing
Richard Bishop – Management
SuzAnn Brantner – Management
Ian Brown – Vocals
Will Brunner – Producer, Remixing
Luke Bullen – Drums
The Crystal Method – Producer, Remixing, Mastering, Mixing
Elite Force – Producer, Remixing
Mike Eller – Artwork
Katy Ellis – Producer
Richard File – Synthesizer, Programming
Richard Flack – Synthesizer, Programming
Antony Genn – Piano, Keyboards
Ginny Hatfield – Producer
Hyper – Producer, Remixing
Ken Jordan – Producer, Mixing, Group Member
Scott Kirkland – Producer, Mixing, Group Member
Maura Lanahan – Photography
The London Session Orchestra 	
Will Malone – Conductor, String Arrangements
Mani – Bass
Julian Napolitano – Producer, Remixing
Chris Olmos – Production Assistant
P. Pardy – Producer
Darren Pearce – Producer, Remixing
Mark Pember – Producer, Remixing
Psycho Pab – Synthesizer, Programming
Rahzel – Vocals
Ronnie – Producer, Remixing
J.A. Ross – Producer
Jude "Proteus" Sabastian – Engineer
Damian Taylor – Synthesizer, Programming
Hanifah Walidah – Vocals
Gavyn Wright – Orchestra Leader

The Crystal Method albums
2005 albums